Tamaha is a town in Haskell County, Oklahoma, United States. The population was 176 at the 2010 census, a decline of 11.1 percent from the figure of 198 in 2000. Tamaha is a Choctaw word meaning town.

Geography
Tamaha is at  (35.394003, -94.988218).

History
Tamaha began as a riverboat landing on the Arkansas River in the 1830s. Initially, the community was called Pleasant Bluff, after a nearby geographic feature. During the Civil War, the Union steamer, J. R. Williams, had carried supplies for the Union army between Fort Smith, Arkansas and Fort Gibson in Indian Territory. On June 15, 1864, Confederate forces under Colonel Stand Watie attacked with cannon and small arms fire as the ship negotiated a bend at Pleasant Bluff.  The ship was crippled and ran aground, where the Confederates captured it.  According to the Encyclopedia of Oklahoma History and Culture, the rusted skeleton of the steamer remains where it was grounded.

At the time of its founding, Tamaha was located in the Moshulatubbee District of the Choctaw Nation.

The town grew slowly after the Civil War. The name changed to Tamaha in 1884, when a post office was established. It had a population of 237 in 1900, increasing to 501 in 1920. However, riverboat traffic, the major source of business, ceased in 1912, Two fires, one in 1919 and the other in 1930, destroyed much of the town. The population fell to 202 in 1930 and declined to its historic low of 80 in 1960. Most of the former residents moved to the nearby town of Stigler. The post office closed in 1954. In the 21st Century, the main source of business is travel by vacationers, attracted by the nearby Kerr Lake. The only physical link to the town's past is the Tamaha Jail and Ferry Landing, listed on the National Register of Historic Places (NR 80003266).

Demographics

As of the census of 2000, there were 198 people, 73 households, and 54 families residing in the town. There were 109 housing units at an average density of 17.0 per square mile (6.6/km2). The racial makeup of the town was 84.34% White, 8.59% Native American, and 7.07% from two or more races.

There were 73 households, out of which 23.3% had children under the age of 18 living with them, 64.4% were married couples living together, 6.8% had a female householder with no husband present, and 24.7% were non-families. 20.5% of all households were made up of individuals, and 11.0% had someone living alone who was 65 years of age or older. The average household size was 2.71 and the average family size was 3.16.

In the town, the population was spread out, with 24.7% under the age of 18, 4.0% from 18 to 24, 21.2% from 25 to 44, 29.8% from 45 to 64, and 20.2% who were 65 years of age or older. The median age was 44 years. For every 100 females, there were 112.9 males. For every 100 females age 18 and over, there were 109.9 males.

The median income for a household in the town was $29,250, and the median income for a family was $35,938. Males had a median income of $27,500 versus $16,563 for females. The per capita income for the town was $11,628. About 4.3% of families and 8.9% of the population were below the poverty line, including none of those under the age of eighteen and 22.6% of those 65 or over.

References

External links
 Tamaha, Haskell County Independent News

Towns in Haskell County, Oklahoma
Towns in Oklahoma